Varmah Kpoto (born 28 January 1978) is a Liberian football defender who was capped 40 times for the Liberia national football team.

Club career
Kpoto joined Greek second division side Ethnikos Olympiakos Volos F.C. for the 1999–00 season.

International career
Kpoto made his international debut for Liberia in a 1998 African Cup of Nations qualifying match against Tanzania on 27 July 1997.

References

External links
 Biography Varmah Kpoto profile – liberiansoccer.com
 
 

1978 births
Living people
Sportspeople from Monrovia
Liberian footballers
Liberia international footballers
2002 African Cup of Nations players
Junior Professional FC players
Olympiacos Volos F.C. players
Mighty Barrolle players
LPRC Oilers players
Association football defenders
Liberian expatriate footballers
Expatriate footballers in Greece
Liberian expatriate sportspeople in Greece
Super League Greece 2 players